13 Organisé, stylized as 13'Organisé, is a French rap album through a collaboration of around 50 French rappers mainly from Marseille. The album was released on Rien 100 Rien label on 9 October 2020.

13 Organisé collective
The project was launched by rapper Jul in mid-August 2020, when he announced it naming the initial participants as SCH, Naps, Soprano, Alonzo, Soso Maness, Kofs, L'Algérino and groups and collectives like IAM, Fonky Family and Ghetto Phénomène, and mentioning the album launch on 9 October 2020. Others added later included Elams, Solda, Houari, Stone Black, Le Rat Luciano, Veazy, Many, Moubarak, Jhonson, As, Fahar, Friz, Vincenzo, Drime, Oussagaza, Don Choa, SAF, 2Bang, Youzi, Sysa, Thabiti, Zbig, AM La Scampia, Keny Arkana, Graya, 100 Blaze, Sauzer, Sat L'Artificier, Banguiz, Kamikaz, Moh, Dadinho, A-Deal & Zak, Diego, Tonyno, Kara, Daz, Bylk, Djiha, Akhenaton, Shurik'n.

Release
On 15 August 2020, Jul released the single "Bande organisée" with SCH, Kofs, Naps, Soso Maness, Elams, Houari and Solda. The single, a prelude for the album was an immediate success and topped the French Singles Chart for several weeks. the single went platinum and then diamond becoming the fastest single being classified diamond in French music history. It also attracted around 148 million views on YouTube until 25 October 2020.

In three days, the album 13 Organisé sold more than 20,000 copies reaching 36,000 copies in a week being certified gold just 2 weeks after release. The album topped the French Albums Chart in its first week of release.

Track list

Charts

Weekly charts

Year-end charts

Top positions of tracks

Certifications and ventes 

|France
|
|
|}

References

2020 albums
French-language albums
Hip hop albums by French artists